Xylit (from xylon, "wood") is a waste product generated by the mining of lignite. As in peat, embedded wooden structures do not become completely sedimented. Its density is around 400 kg/m3.

Uses 

Its very low heat content, even in a dried state, makes it a poor fuel for heat generation. It has been used in France as compost, and is sometimes used in potting soil and as a substrate for horticulture. Because it is more elastic and robust than wood, it can be used as a good substitute for wood chips.

Its unique structure that traps nutrients and pollutants, as well as its high specific surface area (encouraging trickling filter development) and its exceptional longevity (30 years), allow to be used as filter media in some decentralized wastewater systems.

Commercial uses 

 The Belgian company Eloy uses Xylit as filtering media in its X-Perco
 Aquaterra Solutions uses Xylit for riverbank stabilization

See also 
 lignite
 peat

Références

This article is partially translated from German and French Wikipedia articles.

Coal
Organic minerals
Sanitation
Water pollution